Panah Abdullayev is an Azerbaijani karateka. He won the silver medal in the men's kumite 84kg event at the 2021 European Karate Championships held in Poreč, Croatia.

He won the silver medal in the men's 84kg event at the 2021 Islamic Solidarity Games held in Konya, Turkey.

Achievements

References 

Living people
Year of birth missing (living people)
Place of birth missing (living people)
Azerbaijani male karateka
Islamic Solidarity Games medalists in karate
Islamic Solidarity Games competitors for Azerbaijan
21st-century Azerbaijani people